Mata Hari's Daughter (Italian: La figlia di Mata Hari) is a 1954 French-Italian adventure film directed by Carmine Gallone and starring Ludmilla Tchérina, Erno Crisa and Frank Latimore. It is based on a novel of the same title by Jacques Laurent.

The film's sets were designed by the art director Virgilio Marchi.

Cast
 Ludmilla Tchérina as Elyne 
 Erno Crisa as Prince Anak 
 Frank Latimore as Douglas Kent 
 Milly Vitale as Angela 
 Enzo Biliotti as Von Hopen 
 Valéry Inkijinoff as Naos 
 Valentine Olivieri as Zia Giulia 
 Gian Paolo Rosmino as Colonello Stretten 
 Henri Vidon as Il generale americano
 Guido Lauri as a ballet star
 Béatrice Arnac
 Mirela Horiuchi
 Bajoagin Haiopan

References

Bibliography 
 Chiti, Roberto & Poppi, Roberto. Dizionario del cinema italiano: Dal 1945 al 1959. Gremese Editore, 1991.

External links 
 

1954 films
French adventure films
Italian adventure films
1954 adventure films
1950s Italian-language films
Films directed by Carmine Gallone
Films based on French novels
Films based on works by Jacques Laurent
1950s Italian films
1950s French films